Tom Ford (born 11 November 1993 in Worcester) is a professional squash player who represents England. He reached a career-high world ranking of World No. 60 in December 2015.

References

External links 

English male squash players
Living people
1993 births